Mary A. Hakken-Phillips is an American attorney and politician serving as a member of the New Hampshire House of Representatives from the Grafton 12 district. She assumed office on  December 2, 2020.

Education 
Hakken-Phillips earned a Bachelor of Arts degree in political science and government from Alma College, a Master of Arts in political science and government from Loyola University Chicago, and a Juris Doctor from the Michigan State University College of Law.

Career 
Hakken-Phillips began her career as an intern in the office of Senator Kay Bailey Hutchison. She also worked as a legal assistant for Nancy E. Gallagher, a lawyer in Alma, Michigan. As a master's degree student, she worked as a research assistant for Susan Gluck Mezey, a professor at Loyola University Chicago. From 2006 to 2009, Hakken-Phillips worked as the executive assistant to the president and CEO of Mutual Bank. She was also an assistant at United Central Bank and Flexpoint Ford. As a law student, she completed an externship at the University of Michigan Health System Compliance Office. Since 2018, she has been an attorney at Tarbell & Brodich. Hakken-Phillips was elected to the New Hampshire House of Representatives in 2020.

References 

Living people
Alma College alumni
Loyola University Chicago alumni
Michigan State University College of Law alumni
New Hampshire lawyers
Members of the New Hampshire House of Representatives
Women state legislators in New Hampshire
Year of birth missing (living people)